The Veterans' Club Building in Belgrade , at 19 Braće Jugovića Street, is a monumental building, today the Military Club of Serbia , whose basic activities are informing and education of the members of the Serbian Army and the civilian sector through numerous cultural activities such as: exhibitions, concerts, book promotions, public discussions, lectures etc. The premises of the Club are also used for receptions, conferences, seminars, presentations, fairs, business meetings, cocktails, balls and fashion shows. The construction of the Club was finished in 1931 after the design of the professor and architect Jovan Jovanović and Živojin Piperski. The building was built in the style of modernism with the elements of the еxpressionism. The lot for the construction of the Club was donated by the Administration of the City of Belgrade , as a gift to former veterans. The Veterans' Club was built thanks to the donations of the members of the National Defence and the subventions given by the patron king Aleksandar the Unifier . Apart from the military purpose, many cultural associations which cherished patriotism and good relations between the army and the people, that is, the civilians. The most active associations were The Association of the reserve officers and veterans, The Association of the volunteers, Sokolska matica, Adriatic guard, the League of the friends of France etc. were also placed in the Veterans' Club. One part of the object was intended for the accommodation of the guests from the rest of the country. The Club obtained the character of a hotel mostly by constructing of the additional part towards Simina Street. The Veterans' Club has two parts, one built between 1929 and 1932, towards Braće Jugovića Street, and the other, added in 1939 towards Simina, Francuska and Emilijana Josimovića Street. After the invasion and occupation of the country in April 1941 this building was used by the German occupying authority. In August 1941 Wehrmacht officers moved in and the building became the Gestapo Headquarter for the entire Balkan. After the war, on the Victory Day, on 9 May 1946, it was officially established as the Yugoslav Army Club. The first post-war commander and the head of the Club was a professor, a colonel, an academic painter and a graphic artist Branko Šotra. In 1984,based on the decision of the City of Belgrade Assembly , the building was designated as the cultural property. Since 2010 the Club has become the seat of the Меdia centre "Defence"   and the Artistic ensemble "Stanislav Binički".

The history

In early 1929 the decision was made to establish a Veterans' Club in Belgrade , as the central cultural institution of the armed forces and reserve officers. The competition was launched by the Association of the Reserve Officers and Veterans and thirty-one entries were submitted, and the jury – whose members among others were Petar Popović, Svetozar Jovanović and Dragutin Maslać – assessed that none of the thirty-one submitted entries deserved the first prize, arguing that none of them could be further developed without considerable prior modifications, particularly to the facades. Two equal second prizes were awarded, to the work of Živko Piperski and Jovan Jovanović, and to the work of Bogdan Nestorović and Jovan Šnajder, and the final right for the realisation was given to Piperski and Jovanović, with the proviso that they should bring it into harmony with the design of Nestorović and Šnajder. On the other hand, the prevailing opinion of the expert public favoured the design by Branislav Marinković as an original composition in a modernized Serbian-Byzantine style. The design by Piperski and Jovanović was conceived in the style of аcademism, as a monumental Palace with a prominent cornice and a colonnade of pilasters, which was similar to the General Headquarters Building, designed by the architect Wilhelm von Baumgarten, built some time earlier. Unlike them, the facade proposed by Nestorović and Šnajder's design was described as Byzantine-Romanesque, and because of the interaction of different cultural traditions suggested by such a combination, this type of stylistic formulation was considered a desirable model of the national style which enjoyed popularity in the 1920s and 1930s. The final version of the accepted design was considerably different from both second prize winning proposals. Instead of elaborate eclectic architectural ornament, a restrained modernist concept is applied. The founders intended the facility to serve as a headquarters for several national cultural and humanitarian associations on the model of the so-called peoples' houses in Czechoslovakia, Poland and elsewhere. Thus, apart from the Association of Reserve Officers and Soldiers, the building became home to the Adriatic Guards, Volunteers' Association, Sokol Union, Society of the Friends of France, Shooting Association, Fencing Club and Actors Association Fund. In addition to offices, two reception halls and a restaurant, the building's fourth and fifth floor served as a hotel, whose accommodation capacity was reinforced by the addition of the wing facing Simina Street in 1939. The construction began in October 1930 and the building was dedicated on 29 May 1932. The addition of 1939 matched the style of the original building which now occupied the entire block bounded by Braće Jugovića, Francuska, Simina and Emilijana Josimovića streets.

The Architecture

The prominent restrained concept of the front of the building, with no ornaments is applied, especially in the first to third floor zone perforated with sets of vertically aligned windows. The distinctive accent in the ground-floor zone is the central loggia with its slightly protruding arcade supported by massive columns and fronted by a wide flight of stairs. A particularly prominent feature of the building is the corner tower which somewhat relieves the monotony of the front façade, while emphasising the building's expressive monumentality and military character. The idea behind the tower, inspired by medieval and Renaissance models in form, was to emphasise the physical presence of the building and, on the symbolical level, to function as a visual statement of its military character. The symbolism of such an architectural program is best summed up in the words of Мilutin Borisavljević  in the magazine Pravda, from 24 May 1929: Veterans' Club needed to be framed in soldierly terms, in the form of a fortress, a medieval castle with turrets and donjons, with perhaps somewhat brutal forms, i.e. a character of masculinity, heroism etc. Architecture is a symbolic art: the exterior of a building should be expressive of its use.”   This symbolism was also to be expressed by a proposed but unrealised sculptural program consisting of eight statues, one above each column of the loggia: a medieval armoured warrior of the Nemanjić age and of the age of Stefan Dušan, a Kosovo warrior, a gusle player (a traditional Serbian instrument), a member of Karadjordje's insurgent army, a soldier of the 1876 War of Independence, a First Balkan War soldier of 1912, and a Yugoslav soldier of 1918.6 The founders intended the facility to serve as a headquarters The symbolism of the object was also to be expressed by a proposed but unrealized sculptural program on the front facade above the columns of the loggia. The iconographic sculptural program of the Veterans' Club directly indicated the function of the object and consisted of eight individual statues. As the press of that time wrote, a medieval armoured warrior of Nemanjić  Age was supposed to be set up on the first column, an armoured warrior of the age of Dušanon the second, a Kosovo warrior on the third, a gusle player on the fourth, a member of Karađorđe's insurgent army on the fifth, a soldier from 1876 on the sixth, a First Balkan War soldier from 1912 on the seventh and a Yugoslav warrior of 1918 on the eighth. Such an iconographic concept and historical sequence was meant to highlight the continuity of the struggle for the liberation and unification of the South Slavs in keeping with the promoted ideology of Yugoslavism. 
Based on its cultural, historical, architectural and townscape merit, the Veterans' Club at 19 Braće Jugovića Street in Belgrade was designated as a cultural heritage property in 1984.

Gallery

References

External links
Veterans Club-The catalogue of the immovable cultural properties in Belgrade  
The Media Centre „Defence“   
Politika, Marija Brakočević, 29 June 2011.

Military of Serbia
Serbian veterans' organizations